Printer cartridge may refer to:

 Ink cartridge, used in inkjet printers
 Toner cartridge, used in laser printers